Salisbury ministry may refer to:

 First Salisbury ministry, the British government led by Lord Salisbury from 1885 to 1886
 Second Salisbury ministry, the British government led by Lord Salisbury from 1886 to 1892
 Third Salisbury ministry, the British government led by Lord Salisbury from 1895 to 1900
 Fourth Salisbury ministry, the British government led by Lord Salisbury from 1900 to 1902